Turumsa is a possibly extinct Papuan language of Makapa village in Gogodala Rural LLG, Middle Fly District, Papua New Guinea. It has been classified as a Bosavi language, and is 19% lexically similar with Dibiyaso, but this appears to be due to loans. It has a greater (61%) lexical similarity with Doso, its only clear relative.

There were only five elderly speakers found in 2002. Today, most people in Makapa village speak Dibiyaso.

References 

Endangered languages listing: TURUMSA [tqm]

Doso–Turumsa languages
Extinct languages of Oceania
Endangered Papuan languages